Scouting in Delaware has a long history, from the 1910s to the present day, serving thousands of youth in programs that suit the environment in which they live.

Boy Scouts of America

The Wilmington Council (#081) was formed in 1914. In 1931 that council changed names to the Wilmington Area Council, which was still numbered 081. In 1923 the Eastern Shore Council (#221) was formed. In 1924 the Eastern Shore Council merged with the Wilmington Area Council. In 1936 this new Wilmington Area Council was renamed the Del-Mar-Va Council, which was still numbered 081. Today, all Boy Scout units in Delaware are a part of the Del-Mar-Va Council which serves Scouts in Delaware, Maryland and Virginia.

Organization
Del-Mar-Va Council is divided into districts.

Cecil District
Choptank District
Powder Mill
Iron Hill
Sussex District
Tri-County District
Two Bays District
Virginia District

Camps
Del-Mar-Va Council operates three Boy Scout camps:
 Rodney Scout Reservation, also known as Camp Rodney or RSR, located in North East, Maryland - 
 Henson Scout Reservation, also known as Camp Nanticoke or HSR, near Galestown, Maryland - 
 Akridge Scout Reservation, located in Dover, Delaware -

Order of the Arrow Nentego Lodge #20
On July 29, 1925, a charter was granted to Unalachtico Lodge of the Del-Mar-Va Council. The lodge totem was the turkey. By the late 1930s, the lodge had become inactive and was disbanded. Through the efforts of the Delmont Lodge #43 of the Valley Forge Council, Lodge #20 was reorganized on June 22, 1957. The new name chosen by the membership was Nentego, a derivation of the name of one of the major Delaware Tribes, which means, "People from across the water." Delmont Lodge inducted two youth from each district and the council professional staff to provide the initial core of Nentego Lodge. The Lodge totem is the Rockfish, which can be found in the Chesapeake Bay. The lodge colors are blue, for the water of the Chesapeake, and grey, for the Rockfish. The first lodge flap appeared in 1957, and its basic design remains in use today.

Girl Scouts of the USA

The first troop in Delaware was established in 1915 at Mount Zion Lutheran Church in Wilmington, Delaware. In 1962 Wilmington Area Girl Scout Council and Peninsula Girl Scout Council combined to form Girl Scouts of the Chesapeake Bay Council. Today the only Girl Scout council in Delaware is the Girl Scouts of the Chesapeake Bay Council which serves the entire state of Delaware as well as portions of Maryland and Virginia that make up the Delmarva Peninsula.

Camps
Camp Todd near Denton, Maryland
Country Center in Hockessin, Delaware
Grove Point is  near Earleville, Maryland
Sandy Pines is  near Fruitland, Maryland

References

Youth organizations based in Delaware
Delaware
Northeast Region (Boy Scouts of America)